4063 Euforbo is a large Jupiter trojan from the Greek camp, approximately  in diameter. It was discovered on 1 February 1989, by Italian astronomers at the San Vittore Observatory near Bologna, Italy. The dark D-type asteroid is one of the 25 largest Jupiter trojans and has a rotation period of 8.8 hours. It was named after Euphorbus (Euforbo) from Greek mythology.

Orbit and classification 

Euforbo is a dark Jovian asteroid orbiting in the leading Greek camp at Jupiter's  Lagrangian point, 60° ahead of its orbit in a 1:1 resonance (see Trojans in astronomy). It is also a non-family asteroid in the Jovian background population.

It orbits the Sun at a distance of 4.6–5.8 AU once every 11 years and 10 months (4,313 days; semi-major axis of 5.19 AU). Its orbit has an eccentricity of 0.12 and an inclination of 19° with respect to the ecliptic.

Physical characteristics 

In both the Tholen- and SMASS-like taxonomy of the Small Solar System Objects Spectroscopic Survey (S3OS2), Euforbo is a dark D-type asteroid. It is also an assumed, carbonaceous C-type asteroid.

Rotation period 

Since 1992, several rotational lightcurve of Euforbo have been obtained from photometric observations by Stefano Mottola, Robert Stephens, René Roy and astronomers at the Palomar Transient Factory. In November 2010, the best-rated lightcurve by James W. Brinsfield at the Via Capote Observatory , California, gave a rotation period of 8.846 hours with a brightness amplitude of 0.19 magnitude.

Diameter and albedo 

According to the surveys carried out by the Japanese Akari satellite, the Infrared Astronomical Satellite IRAS, and the NEOWISE mission of NASA's Wide-field Infrared Survey Explorer, Euforbo measures between 95.62 and 106.38 kilometers in diameter and its surface has an albedo between 0.057 and 0.070.

The Collaborative Asteroid Lightcurve Link derives an albedo of 0.0558 and a diameter of 102.35 kilometers based on an absolute magnitude of 8.7.

Naming 

This minor planet was named from Greek mythology after Euphorbus (Euforbo), the Greek hero who wounded Patroclus in the breast before being killed by Hektor. The official naming citation was published by the Minor Planet Center on 19 January 1992.

Notes

References

External links 
 Asteroid Lightcurve Database (LCDB), query form (info )
 Dictionary of Minor Planet Names, Google books
 Asteroids and comets rotation curves, CdR – Observatoire de Genève, Raoul Behrend
 Discovery Circumstances: Numbered Minor Planets (1)-(5000) – Minor Planet Center
 
 

004063
004063
Named minor planets
19890201